Numan Bostan Soysal (born 31 January 1998 in France) is a French footballer.

Career

Bostan did not start playing club football until the age of 12. Despite this, he soon joined Toulouse amid interest from Nantes, Girondins de Bordeaux, Olympique Lyonnais, and Olympique de Marseille.

In 2015, Bostan was part of the France squad that won that year's UEFA European Under-17 Championship even though he did not make an appearance during the tournament.

After making one appearance for Toulouse in the French Ligue 1, he signed for Turkish club Gençlerbirliği S.K., before being sent on loan to Hacettepe S.K. in the Turkish third division.

References

External links
Numan Bostan at Soccerway

French footballers
Association football goalkeepers
Ligue 1 players
Championnat National 3 players
TFF Second League players
Toulouse FC players
Hacettepe S.K. footballers
French people of Turkish descent
Living people
1998 births